Continental Magazine was an American magazine published in 1883, in Baltimore, by A. C. Meyer.

References

Defunct magazines published in the United States
Agricultural magazines
Little magazines
Magazines established in 1883
Magazines disestablished in 1883
1883 establishments in the United States
Mass media in Baltimore
Magazines published in Maryland